Koyna Wildlife Sanctuary is a wildlife sanctuary and natural World Heritage Site, which is located in Satara district of the Indian state of Maharashtra. Further, this wildlife sanctuary is designated as an Important Bird area. It was notified in 1985 as a wildlife sanctuary situated in Maharashtra. It forms the northern portion of the Sahyadri Tiger Reserve, with Chandoli National Park forming the southern part of the reserve.

History
The legend states that the fort was constructed by Malwa king Raja Bhoja in 1170.

Geography
The rivers Koyna, Kandati, and Solashi meander through the sanctuary. It also forms the catchment area for the Koyna River, and  Shivsagar reservoir formed by the Koyna Dam. To the south of the park lies the Chandoli National Park. The sanctuary includes eastern and western catchments of the Koyna dam. The sanctuary is well protected by the large extent of Shivsagar reservoir and steep slopes of the Western Ghats on both the sides. This protected area is connected by a forested wildlife corridor to Chandoli National Park and Radhanagari Wildlife Sanctuary in the south. Like Chandoli, Koyna is part of Sahyadri Tiger Reserve.

Flora
The sanctuary has dense forests with three major sections, Vasota, Maharkhor and Indavli Met, and is endowed with natural protective boundaries, with Shivsagar Lake on one side, and the slopes of the Western Ghats on both sides. These geographic barriers have enabled the emergence of a wide variety of flora and fauna and high biodiversity in the sanctuary. Dominant species are anjani, jambul, hirda, awala, pisa, ain, kinjal, amba, kumbha, bhoma, chandala, katak, nana, umbra, jambha, gela and bibba. Karvi is found almost all over the area. Climbers such as shikekai, garambi are common. Some of the  threatened species of trees  found in the sanctuary are dhup (Indian frankincense), longan, and Elaeocarpus spp. Shrubs and medicinal plants such as karvand, agati, ranmiri, tamalpati, toran, dhayati, kadipatta, narkya and murudsheng, along with a small quantity of bamboo are also found. A large number of ephemeral bulbs of seasonal plants are found.

Fauna
The sanctuary has a diverse variety of mammals including the keystone species, Bengal tigers (>6). Also, Indian leopards (14), Indian gaur (220-250), sloth bears (70-80), sambar deer (160-175), barking deer (180-200) and mouse deer,  gray langurs, smooth-coated otters and Indian giant squirrels are common. Many species of birds are found in the sanctuary including the distinctive heart-spotted woodpecker, rufous woodpecker, and brown-capped pygmy woodpecker, Asian fairy bluebird, Malabar pied hornbill, long-tailed nightjar and crested goshawk. Large Indian pythons and Spectacled cobras are found here. An endemic Toad Bufo koyanansis has its only habitat in this protected area.

Threats
The sanctuary now has 215 windmills and 10 tourist resorts. An earthen dam is under construction and many trees have been felled. Land inside the sanctuary has been sold. More than 900 land deals have been finalised since 1985.

Gallery

See also

 Koyna Hydroelectric Project
 Vashishti River

References

External links
 Koyna Wildlife Sanctuary

North Western Ghats moist deciduous forests
Wildlife sanctuaries of the Western Ghats
North Western Ghats montane rain forests
Tiger reserves of India
Wildlife sanctuaries in Maharashtra
Tourist attractions in Satara district
1985 establishments in Maharashtra
Protected areas established in 1985